Akron is a city in Plymouth County, Iowa, United States. The population was 1,558 at the 2020 census.

History
Akron was incorporated September 7, 1882. The town's name is a transfer from Akron, Ohio.

Geography
Akron is considered the northern gateway to the Loess Hills and the Loess Hills Scenic Byway. These unique hills made up of windblown soil stretch southward from Akron toward St. Joseph, Missouri.

Demographics

2010 census
As of the census of 2010, there were 1,486 people, 625 households, and 407 families living in the city. The racial makeup of the city was 97.4% White, 0.4% African American, 0.6% Native American, 0.1% Asian, 0.1% Pacific Islander, 0.5% from other races, and 0.9% from two or more races. Hispanic or Latino of any race were 0.5% of the population.

There were 625 households, of which 27.5% had children under the age of 18 living with them, 52.8% were married couples living together, 8.3% had a female householder with no husband present, 4.0% had a male householder with no wife present, and 34.9% were non-families. 32.5% of all households were made up of individuals, and 17.3% had someone living alone who was 65 years of age or older. The average household size was 2.32 and the average family size was 2.92.

The median age in the city was 42.1 years. 23.8% of residents were under the age of 18; 5.7% were between the ages of 18 and 24; 23.4% were from 25 to 44; 22.9% were from 45 to 64; and 24.4% were 65 years of age or older. The gender makeup of the city was 47.0% male and 53.0% female.

2000 census

As of the census of 2000, there were 1,489 people, 667 households, and 424 families living in the city. The racial makeup of the city was 99.13% White, 0.34% African American, 0.07% Native American, and 0.47% from two or more races. Hispanic or Latino of any race were 0.27% of the population.

There were 667 households, out of which 27.7% had children under the age of 18 living with them, 53.2% were married couples living together, 7.5% had a female householder with no husband present, and 36.4% were non-families. 34.2% of all households were made up of individuals, and 20.8% had someone living alone who was 65 years of age or older. The average household size was 2.23 and the average family size was 2.85.23.9% were under the age of 18, 6.8% from 18 to 24, 24.0% from 25 to 44, 20.0% from 45 to 64, and 25.3% were 65 years of age or older. The median age was 42 years. For every 100 females, there were 92.1 males. For every 100 females age 18 and over, there were 87.6 males.

The median income for a household in the city was $29,583, and the median income for a family was $37,404. Males had a median income of $30,875 versus $21,286 for females. The per capita income for the city was $18,631. About 6.2% of families and 7.2% of the population were below the poverty line, including 7.8% of those under age 18 and 11.0% of those age 65 or over.

Education
Public education in the city is operated by Akron–Westfield Community School District, which includes Akron–Westfield Senior High School. The district formed on July 1, 1981, as a merger of the Akron and Westfield school districts.

Notable people
 Alan J. Heeger, recipient of the 2002 Nobel Prize in Chemistry. Heeger grew up in Akron, where his father owned a general store.
 J. Henry Lucken, representative to the Iowa General Assembly from 1947 to 1949. Born in Akron.
 Frank J. Swanson, representative to the Iowa General Assembly from 1929 to 1931.  Swanson moved to Akron, where he owned a furniture and hardware business.
 Anna Johnson Pell Wheeler, mathematician. Moved to Akron at age nine.

See also

 List of cities in Iowa

References

External links

 The Akron Hometowner Website

Cities in Iowa
Cities in Plymouth County, Iowa
Populated places established in 1882
1882 establishments in Iowa